Tomás Bolzicco (born November 29, 1994 in Santa Fe, Argentina) is an Argentine footballer who plays as a forward for Unión La Calera of the Primera División B in Chile.

References
 
 
 

1994 births
Living people
Argentine footballers
Footballers from Santa Fe, Argentina
Association football forwards
Unión de Santa Fe footballers
Unión La Calera footballers
Primera B de Chile players
Argentine expatriate footballers
Argentine expatriate sportspeople in Chile
Expatriate footballers in Chile